St. Thomas Mount-Poonamallee Road, popularly known as the Mount-Poonamallee Road (SH-55), is an arterial road in the city of Chennai, India. It runs for 11 kilometres from Kathipara Junction to the NH 4 highway connecting St. Thomas Mount with the suburb of Poonamallee. About 5 kilometres of the Mount-Poonamallee Road is located in the Alandur taluk of Chennai district, part of Maduravoyal Taluk in Chennai district and the remainder in the Poonamallee taluk of Thiruvallur district.

Features 

The road is divided into two sections. The first section from St. Thomas Mount to Nandambakkam covering a distance of one kilometre is more narrow than the rest of the stretch and is known as Butt Road.

Places transversed 

 St. Thomas Mount
 Nandambakkam
 Ramapuram
 Manapakkam
 Mugalivakkam
 Porur
 Iyyappanthangal
 Kattupakkam
 Karayanchavadi
 Kumananchavadi            
 Poonamallee

See also

 Transport in Chennai

References 
 

Roads in Chennai